In 2008 there were 15,941 crimes reported in South Dakota, including 37 murders. In 2014 there were 18,688 crimes reported, including 20 murders.

Capital punishment laws

Capital punishment is applied in this state.

References